Cooke City is an unincorporated community and census-designated place (CDP) in Park County, Montana, United States. As of the 2010 census, it had a population of 75. Prior to 2010, it was part of the Cooke City-Silver Gate CDP.

The town's chief industry is tourism, which during the winter includes skiing and snowmobiling.

It is named for Jay Cooke, financier of the Northern Pacific Railroad.

Geography
Cooke City is near the southeast corner of Park County, bordered to the south by the North Absaroka Wilderness within Shoshone National Forest in the state of Wyoming, and to the west by the community of Silver Gate, Montana. The two towns sit in the valley of Soda Butte Creek, which flows southwest into Wyoming to join the Lamar River in Yellowstone National Park. The valley is part of the Yellowstone River watershed.

U.S. Route 212, the Beartooth Highway, passes through the center of Cooke City, leading southwest into Yellowstone National Park, and east over  Colter Pass in the eastern part of the CDP to continue southeast back into Wyoming in the valley of the Clarks Fork Yellowstone River and thence into the Beartooth Mountains.

Climate 
Summers consist of mild to warm days with crisp, cool mornings, and winters are long and very cold, with many nights falling below zero. Snowfall is abundant, with most of it falling between the months of October to May, though snow does occasionally fall in the months of June and September. Cooke City is listed as the snowiest community in Montana.

Demographics

References 

Census-designated places in Park County, Montana
Census-designated places in Montana